The National Wind Tunnel Facility (NWTF), is an initiative in which 17 wind tunnels distributed across seven UK universities (host institutions) are made open access (for up to 25% of time) to external researchers in the UK and abroad, from both university and industry based.

NWTF is intended to be as inclusive as possible while still  supporting the best science. The scheme was announced on 9 January 2014 by David Willetts, Minister for Science and Universities. The total funding for the Facility is £13.3 million, £10.7 million coming from EPSRC and £2.6 million from the UK Aerospace Technology Institute.

The EPSRC and ATI decided to fund the NWTF in order to match the UK talent base to world-class wind tunnel facilities. The enhanced UK capability in experimental aerodynamics is available to all UK-based researchers.  The stated aim was to create nodes of excellence attracting young researchers. Another aim was to establish a closer tie with industry, creating a pull-through environment and an intended spill-over of the collaboration and benefits to other sectors.

The NWTF programme was to have a duration of five years. A mid-term review was to review the progress made during the first two and a half years. The current end date is December 2018,

Wind tunnels available

Governance 
The NWTF has a Management Board (MB) that meets approximately every 3 months. This is composed of a Principal Investigator from each of the current host institutions and the NWTF Project Manager. The current MB members are Professor Holger Babinsky (University of Cambridge), Professor Chris Atkin (City University), Professor Kevin Garry (Cranfield University), Dr Richard Green (University of Glasgow), Professor Jonathan Morrison (Imperial College), Professor Peter Ireland (University of Oxford), Professor Bharathram Ganapathisubramani (University of Southampton) and Dr Kevin Gouder (NWTF Project Manager). A

n Advisory Board (AB) oversees the broader aims of the NWTF, monitors the running of the NWTF and reviews progress versus Key Performance Indicators. The AB is composed of representatives from EPSRC, ATI, senior academics (from the UK and abroad), representatives from industry, an existing National Facility Manager and is chaired by an independent senior UK-based aerodynamicist.

Key Dates

References

Aerospace industry in the United Kingdom
College and university associations and consortia in the United Kingdom
Engineering and Physical Sciences Research Council
Engineering education in the United Kingdom
Engineering research institutes
Research institutes in the United Kingdom
Wind tunnels